On May 17, 1971, Efraim Elrom, the Israeli consul-general in Turkey was kidnapped in Ankara and murdered by the Turkish People's Liberation Army.

Background 
The 1970s were a turbulent time in Turkish history. Until martial law was imposed in Istanbul and Ankara on April 26, 1971, left‐wing extremists had been responsible for two kidnappings of American servicemen as well as two abductions of wealthy Turks. They had also robbed several banks and bombed numerous businesses and schools. Elrom's abduction broke period of relative inactivity on the part of the leftist militants.

Victim 
Efraim Elrom (né Hofstaedter) was born in Poland in 1911. In 1969, he joined the foreign service and as required and adopted a Hebrew name as required. He was assistant commander of a special interrogation unit set up immediately after Adolf Eichmann's capture by Israeli agents in Argentina in 1960. After 27 years of service, he retired from the police force after 27 years. He left behind a widow, Elsa Elrom, but no children.

Assassination 
On Monday, May 17, 1971, Elrom, the then-Israeli consul-general was abducted by militants of the Turkish People's Liberation Army. The terrorists kidnapped the diplomat when he returned to his apartment for lunch, striking him after he fought back, before carrying him wrapped in a sheet to a waiting car. Elrom's abductors demanded the release of imprisoned revolutionary militants in exchange for his release. The Turkish government refused this request and launched a mass arrest of prominent leftists. A subsequent curfew and the house-to-house search of Istanbul hastened the execution of Elrom, whose body was found in an apartment in the Nişantaşı quarter of Istanbul at 04:15 five days later on Sunday May 23, 1971 with three bullet wounds in his head.

Perpetrators 
Mahir Çayan, Ulaş Bardakçı, and Hüseyin Cevahir were identified as the abductors. The militant Turkish People's Liberation Army, a group linked with the Marxist Palestinian guerilla group Popular Front for the Liberation of Palestine, claimed responsibility for the abduction. The group first came to attention on March 4 when it kidnapped four American servicemen in Ankara. Palestinian guerilla propaganda was frequently confiscated from Turkish leftists, and many militants received guerilla training in Arab countries, particularly in Syria.

Aftermath 
The Turkish government and military cracked down on the entire radical left in Turkey, with the country seeing mass arrests. Israeli-Turkish relations became strained as Israeli authorities felt as if Turkey did not do everything possible to have Elrom rescued.

References 

1971 murders in Europe
Assassinated Israeli diplomats
1971 in Turkey
Assassinations in Turkey
Israel–Turkey relations